Beta Chi Theta (also Beta Chi) is a nationally recognized South Asian interest fraternity in the United States, established in 1999 at the University of California, Los Angeles (UCLA).  On June 2, 1999, Beta Chi Theta was acknowledged by the university and granted membership into the UCLA Inter-Fraternity Council (IFC). Beta Chi Theta was founded by eight young men and today has chapters and colonies located all over the United States. It is the largest South Asian Fraternity in the USA.

The founding principles which support and give purpose to Beta Chi Theta are creating and maintaining a strong, close-knit brotherhood; honoring tradition; pursuing service to humanity; increasing cultural awareness; promoting academic excellence; and building a unified nationwide network.

Though the fraternity has primarily brothers of Indian American, Pakistani American and Bangladeshi backgrounds, membership in Beta Chi Theta has become diverse, with brothers from all backgrounds, races, cultures, religions, and sexual orientations.

National Founding Fathers

Philanthropy
Beta Chi Theta seeks to promote service to humanity through engagement within the local communities of its respective chapters and colonies. Service to humanity is one of the six pillars that defines the foundation of the organization. Brothers across the country participate in service both directly and indirectly through organizational activities. The fraternity encourages members to give back to the community in which they are fostered, help those in need, and mentor those who look up to them.

Nationally, regionally, and locally, Beta Chi Theta works with many non-profit organizations to support numerous causes that bind them together as a brotherhood. They believe that through outreach they can impact the lives of many around them and simultaneously become closer to one another.

The fraternity has two national philanthropy initiatives: Beating Heart Disease and Be the Change.

Beating Heart Disease
In 2009, it was voted that the fraternity's national philanthropy would be cardiac health awareness and research fundraising since it is the number one cause of death in not only the US, but the world, and it is also especially rampant amongst the South Asian population. Since then, they have partnered with American Heart Association to teach communities across the country on how to live a heart-healthy lifestyle and also to raise money for cardiac research and education. The Beating Heart Disease program is a string of week-long events thrown in the spring of every year by chapters and colonies in an effort to educate young students on cardiac health and also to raise money for American Heart Association. An additional aspect of this partnership involves the participation of brothers in Heart Walks, which are hosted annually across the nation by the American Heart Association.

Be The Change
In addition, the brothers of Beta Chi Theta have partnered annually with SAALT (South Asian Americans Leading Together) to host Be The Change Days of Service on university campuses across the nation. Be The Change is an annual occurrence in the fall of each year that pays tribute to the life of Mahatma Gandhi. Gandhi once said to "be the change you wish to see in the world." This partnership with SAALT allows the members of the fraternity to recruit people for volunteer work in their circles and positively influence their communities.

Motto
"Above all else,  Brotherhood"

North American Interfraternity Conference 
On April 23, 2006, Beta Chi Theta became the first nationally recognized South Asian-based fraternity through its acceptance of membership into the North American Interfraternity Conference (NIC). At seven years of age, it was the youngest fraternity ever to become a member of the NIC in its 100-year history.

Chapters
Chapters and colonies of Beta Chi Theta include the following.  Those in bold are active, those in italics are dormant:

Chapters
Alpha chapter - University of California, Los Angeles
Beta chapter - Baylor University
Gamma chapter - California State Polytechnic University, Pomona
Delta chapter - University of Oklahoma
Epsilon chapter - University of California, Riverside
Ζeta chapter - University of California, San Diego
Eta chapter  - The University of Texas at Austin
Theta chapter - Vanderbilt University
Iota chapter - Purdue University
Lambda chapter - University of Minnesota
Mu chapter - University of Florida
Pi chapter - Texas A&M University
Rho chapter - The University of Tennessee, Knoxville
Sigma chapter - Rutgers University
Upsilon chapter - University of Texas at Dallas
Phi chapter - University of Illinois at Urbana–Champaign
Omega chapter - University of Alabama at Birmingham
Alpha Alpha chapter - Northeastern University
Alpha Beta chapter - Drexel University
Alpha Gamma chapter - University of Massachusetts Amherst
Alpha Delta chapter - Indiana University Bloomington
Alpha Epsilon chapter - University of Georgia

Colonies
Κappa colony - Florida Atlantic University
Νu colony - University of Wisconsin–Madison
Xi colony - University of Houston
Omicron colony - Emory University
Tau colony - University of South Florida
Psi colony - University of Connecticut
Alpha Zeta colony - Arizona State University
Alpha Eta colony - Binghamton University

Chi chapter
Chi chapter - This chapter is reserved for those brothers who are deceased.

See also
List of social fraternities and sororities

References

External links
Beta Chi Theta national site

Asian-American culture in Los Angeles
Student organizations established in 1999
North American Interfraternity Conference
Student societies in the United States
Asian-American fraternities and sororities
1999 establishments in California